Admiral Ernest Alfred Simons (3 September 1856 – 30 August 1928) was a Royal Navy officer who became Admiral Superintendent of Malta Dockyard.

Naval career
Promoted to captain on 31 December 1896, Simons became Director of Naval Ordnance on 10 May 1898. He was commanding officer of the battleship HMS Illustrious in July 1903 and commanding officer of the battleship  in March 1906. Promoted to rear admiral on 1 January 1907, he became Admiral Superintendent of Malta Dockyard in January 1910. He was promoted to vice admiral on 27 August 1911 and to full admiral on 24 October 1914.

References

1856 births
1928 deaths
Royal Navy admirals